Our Relations is a 1936 feature film starring Laurel and Hardy, produced by Stan Laurel for Hal Roach Studios. This is the third of three films in which they play a dual role: the first was Brats and the second was Twice Two. The story is based on the short story "The Money Box" by W.W. Jacobs, author of "The Monkey's Paw".

Premise
One day Stan and Ollie receive a letter with a photo of them with their twin brothers Alf and Bert. For years it has been believed that Alf and Bert are dead. In reality, they are still alive and working as sailors on the SS Periwinkle which happens to moor in the harbour of the city where Stan and Ollie live with their wives, Daphne and Betty. Onboard the ship, the chief engineer, Finn, is enthusiastic about saving and becoming a millionaire. Since Alf and Bert also dream of becoming millionaires, they leave their wages of $74 with Finn, who promises to keep the money safely for them. Before they disembark, the captain hands the pair a small package to keep for him temporarily. In a beer garden, Alf and Bert impulsively agree to buy two young ladies dinner. But the women order expensive items and Alf and Bert have only one dollar. They tell the landlord they will need to fetch money, and leave him the contents of the captain's package, a valuable ring, as security. They go straight to Finn, who refuses to return their wages. So they sell his sailor suit in a pawn shop and receive two dollars. Disappointed, they go back to Finn, who explains that their wages have been sewn into the lining of his suit. He persuades Alf and Bert to give him their suits so he can wear one and trade the other for the pawned suit. He has no intention of keeping his promise and returning the money.

Meanwhile, Stan and Ollie visit the beer garden with their wives and are indignantly asked to pay the bill by, to-them unknown, Alice and Lily, whom Alf and Bert left behind. This in turn angers Daphne and Betty. Under pressure, Ollie pays the bill run up by Alice and Lily and is mystifyingly given the ring left as security by Alf and Bert. Finn appears and shows a photo of Alf and Bert with some other young women to Daphne and Betty, who angrily leave the restaurant. Stan and Ollie, who are also angry, cause Finn to be beaten up by the landlord and the waiter, and he threatens revenge. Meanwhile, Alf and Bert are in Finn's quarters and decide to visit the landlord and ask for the ring. Having nothing to wear, they dress in blankets and scarves and are arrested. Stan and Ollie's wives, who had been informed by a spectator of the arrest of their "husbands", convince the judge to give them another chance. To celebrate, they go to a restaurant, where Stan and Ollie are already seated. Stan & Ollie and Alf & Bert do not notice each other. Ollie still has the ring and mistakenly puts it in Alf's pocket as he passes by, and later asks a bewildered Stan to give him back the ring. This is noticed by Mafia men, after which Stan and Ollie are kidnapped, taken to the waterfront and told to hand over the ring. The gangsters threaten to throw them off the dock in cement shoes. But the two manage to push their captors into the water and, after rocking wildly in the cement shoes, also fall into the water. Alf and Bert are nearby, hiding from the captain and Finn. They discover the ring in Alf's pocket and return it to the captain before rescuing Stan and Ollie from the water. The two pairs of twins happily reunite and decide to go explain the situation to Stan and Ollie's wives. Neither Stan nor Alf "can see any further than the end of their nose", agree Ollie and Bert, who promptly step off the dock and fall into the water.

Cast

Production
In most of the Laurel and Hardy films, their usual Stan and Ollie characters are a pair of hopeless but likable dimwits, often just barely able to earn a living. In Our Relations, Stan and Ollie are respectable citizens with wives and steady employment. It is their seafaring twin brothers, Alf Laurel and Bert Hardy, who are dim-witted incompetent sailors aboard the S.S Periwinkle.

On board, Alf and Bert wear seafaring garb. Once ashore, they dress in "civilian" clothes—down to the traditional derbies—making them nearly indistinguishable from their brothers. Stan always wore a bow-tie, while Oliver wore the more conventional type. This is reversed for the brothers, with Alf wearing the usual style and Bert wearing the bowtie. Music cues also help differentiate between the twins; Laurel & Hardy's theme song, "Dance of the Cuckoos", plays when Stan and Ollie appear; the tunes "Sailing, Sailing over the Bounding Main" or "Sailor's Hornpipe", play when Alf and Bert are onscreen.

The film is distinguished by the camera work of successful dramatic cinematographer Rudolph Maté (The Passion of Joan of Arc). The film was based on the story The Money Box by W.W. Jacobs. The story was adapted by Jack Jevne and Charley Rogers and the film written by Felix Adler and Richard Connell.

Legacy
In 2000, the Dutch revivalist orchestra The Beau Hunks collaborated with the Metropole Orchestra to re-create composer Leroy Shield's soundtrack to Our Relations from original sheet music that had been discovered in a Los Angeles archive in 1994 and 1995.

References

External links 

 
 
 
 
 
 The Money Box Text of the short story which was the basis for the film.

1936 films
1936 comedy films
American black-and-white films
Films about twin brothers
Films based on works by W. W. Jacobs
Films directed by Harry Lachman
Laurel and Hardy (film series)
Metro-Goldwyn-Mayer films
Films based on short fiction
Films with screenplays by Felix Adler (screenwriter)
1930s English-language films
1930s American films